Barton Community College, previously Barton County Community College, is a public community college in Great Bend, Kansas. Its service area includes Barton, Ellsworth, Pawnee, Rush and Russell Counties, Stafford County north of US Highway 50, and northwestern Rice County.

History
Barton Community College was founded on July 15, 1965, through an election by the people of Barton County, Kansas. Its first name was Barton County Junior College, which was later shortened to its current name, Barton Community College.

Athletics

The school participates at the Division I level and is affiliated with the NJCAA (National Junior College Athletic Association).  The school is also a member of the Kansas Jayhawk Community College Conference. American sprinter Tyson Gay, who holds the American record in the 100 meters, is a notable alumnus.

Notable alumni
 Tabarie Henry, two-time Olympic Games sprinter
 Kenny Williams, professional basketball player

References

External links
 

Education in Barton County, Kansas
Buildings and structures in Barton County, Kansas
Community colleges in Kansas
Two-year colleges in the United States
NJCAA athletics
Educational institutions established in 1965
1965 establishments in Kansas